The vertebrate mitochondrial code (translation table 2) is the genetic code found in the mitochondria of all vertebrata.

Evolution
AGA and AGG were thought to have become mitochondrial stop codons early in vertebrate evolution.  However, at least in humans it has now been shown that AGA and AGG sequences are not recognized as termination codons. A -1 mitoribosome frameshift occurs at the AGA and AGG codons predicted to terminate the CO1 and ND6 open reading frames (ORFs), and consequently both ORFs terminate in the standard UAG codon.

Incomplete stop codons
Mitochondrial genes in some vertebrates (including humans) have incomplete stop codons ending in U or UA, which become complete termination codons (UAA) upon subsequent polyadenylation.

Translation table

 The codon AUG both codes for methionine and serves as an initiation site: the first AUG in an mRNA's coding region is where translation into protein begins.

Differences from the standard code

Alternative initiation codons
 Bos: AUA
 Homo: AUA, AUU
 Mus: AUA, AUU, AUC
 Coturnix, Gallus: also GUG

See also 
 List of genetic codes

References
 This article contains public domain text from the  NCBI page compiled by Andrzej (Anjay) Elzanowski and Jim Ostell.

Molecular genetics
Gene expression
Protein biosynthesis